Aabel is a Norwegian surname. Notable people with the surname include:

Andreas Leigh Aabel (1830–1901), Norwegian physician and poet
Hauk Aabel (1869–1961), Norwegian comedian
Oluf Andreas Aabel (1825–1895), Norwegian priest and writer
Per Aabel (1902–1999), Norwegian comic actor

See also
Aabel, cultivar of Phoenix dactylifera

Norwegian-language surnames